Dysspastus is a Palearctic moth genus in the family Autostichidae.

Species
 Dysspastus baldizzonei Gozmány, 1977
 Dysspastus cinerascens Gozmány, 1969
 Dysspastus djinn (Gozmány, 1963)
 Dysspastus erroris (Gozmány, 1962)
 Dysspastus fallax (Gozmány, 1961)
 Dysspastus gracilellus (Turati, 1922)
 Dysspastus hartigi Gozmány, 1977
 Dysspastus hebraicus Gozmány, 2008
 Dysspastus ios Gozmány, 2000
 Dysspastus lilliput Gozmány, 1996
 Dysspastus mediterraneus (Gozmány, 1957)
 Dysspastus mucronatus Gozmány, 2008
 Dysspastus musculina (Staudinger, 1870)
 Dysspastus perpygmaeella (Walsingham, 1901)
 Dysspastus undecimpunctella (Mann, 1864)

References

External links
  Images representing  Dysspastus at Consortium for the Barcode of Life

 
Symmocinae
Moth genera